The 2003 NBL season was the 22nd season of the National Basketball League. 2003 marked the first year a league-wide MVP award winner was named, allowing imports the opportunity to be recognised; in all previous seasons, only a Kiwi MVP was named, an award given to the best New Zealand player. Australian import David Cooper of the Manawatu Jets was subsequently awarded the first league MVP. 2003 also marked the return of Taranaki after a three-year hiatus. The Wellington Saints won the championship over the Waikato Titans in overtime, as the Saints claimed their fifth league title.

Summary

Regular season standings

Playoff bracket

Awards

Player of the Week

Statistics leaders
Stats as of the end of the regular season

Regular season
 Most Valuable Player: David Cooper (Manawatu Jets)
 NZ Most Valuable Player: Dillon Boucher (Waikato Titans)
 Most Outstanding Guard: Lindsay Tait (Auckland Stars)
 Most Outstanding NZ Guard: Lindsay Tait (Auckland Stars)
 Most Outstanding Forward: David Cooper (Manawatu Jets)
 Most Outstanding NZ Forward/Centre: Dillon Boucher (Waikato Titans)
 Scoring Champion: John Whorton (Canterbury Rams)
 Rebounding Champion: John Whorton (Canterbury Rams)
 Assist Champion: George Le'afa (Wellington Saints)
 Rookie of the Year: Adrian Majstrovich (Hawke's Bay Hawks)
 Coach of the Year: Mike McHugh (Wellington Saints)
 All-Star Five:
 G: Paul Henare (Hawke's Bay Hawks)
 G: Lindsay Tait (Auckland Stars)
 F: Dillon Boucher (Waikato Titans)
 F: Link Abrams (Taranaki Mountainairs)
 C: David Cooper (Manawatu Jets)

References

External links
2003 NBL Teams and Draw
Team stats links
2003 season links

National Basketball League (New Zealand) seasons
2003 in New Zealand basketball